Rec (stylized as REC) is a Japanese manga series by Q-Tarō Hanamizawa. It was serialized by Shogakukan's seinen manga magazine Monthly Sunday Gene-X from November 2002 to March 2013, with its chapters collected in sixteen tankōbon volumes. The story follows the relationship between Fumihiko Matsumaru, a salaryman, and Aka Onda, an aspiring voice actress. A nine-episode anime adaptation by Shaft aired between February and March 2006; an original video animation episode was also produced.

Plot
At the beginning of the story, Fumihiko Matsumaru is outside a movie theater waiting for his date to arrive. When it becomes obvious that he has been "stood up", he crumples his tickets in frustration. As he is about to toss the tickets into a trash can, a girl approaches, and in the "voice" of the tickets, implores him to not waste them. Dumbfounded, he sees the movie with her, which is Roman Holiday.

During the movie, he notices that the girl is reading the subtitles out loud. When he asks her about this after the movie, she says that she was practicing the lines, and that she wants to be Audrey Hepburn. At dinner, she explains that she is a 20-year-old novice voice actress. Going home, they find that they live in the same neighborhood before they part ways. (In the anime, she recites appropriate lines from Roman Holiday.) Matsumaru goes to bed, but he cannot sleep. In the darkness, he hears the sounds of sirens; there is a fire in the neighborhood. When he goes to investigate, he discovers that the girl's apartment has burned down. Since she has nowhere to stay, Matsumaru asks her to stay at his apartment; she dazedly accepts.

The next day, Matsumaru learns at work that his marketing concept  has been approved as the mascot of a snack product called "Ha" ("leaf"). Furthermore, Aka is chosen to voice Nekoki. They decide to keep their live-in relationship a secret from their employers due to Aka's worries about an appearance of impropriety. She also insists they are not a couple just from having slept together once in a moment of weakness, and that she will merely be lodging with him. The series is heavily concerned with the developing dynamic of their relationship.

Characters

An average, 26-year-old salaryman who works in the marketing department of a snack company. He always tries hard to get his advertisement projects chosen, but almost always fails at this. His latest project, Nekoki, was chosen for the mascot of a snack food called  and is his first accepted project.
In chapter seven of the manga Matsumaru finally asks Aka to be his girlfriend after they share a passionate kiss for the second time, to which she agrees. Although Matsumaru is in love with Aka he is not above admiring the "assets" of other females, which often puts him in compromising situations; such as when he decides not to erase the doctored photo of him and Ao because her breasts were exposed and Aka accidentally sees it. Also, Matsumaru will at times barge in on Aka without her clothes on or grope some part of her body which earns him a harsh reprimand.

A 20-year-old aspiring voice actress who idolizes Audrey Hepburn. She voiced the snack food Ha'''s image character, Nekoki. She is a little eccentric in her actions as she often quotes movie lines from films Audrey Hepburn starred in.  She lives with Matsumaru in his apartment, and usually asserts that she is only friends with him, despite the fact she and Matsumaru slept together the first night they met.  This provides the crux of the remainder of the series. Kanako Sakai, the voice actress who voiced Aka Onda, also sang the opening theme: .
In chapter seven of the manga, Aka agrees to be Matsumaru's girlfriend, but they must keep it a secret at all costs. Even though Aka is in love with Matsumaru, she is very shy and does not like him to see her naked. When Matsumaru does something lecherous Aka will strike him as hard as possible. Even though she is embarrassed, Aka is always waiting for the time where she and Matsumaru can have sex for the second time. Usually when they finally get the chance it's interrupted by anything from Sekigahara suddenly appearing to Matsumaru being unable to perform because he thought he had cheated on Aka.

Aka's manager-in-charge. She is sleeping with the company's president. She accidentally gets into two compromising situations with Matsumaru, and he has to spend some time calming Aka down when she sees them.

She is a colleague Matsumaru had a crush on before he made Aka his girlfriend. It is later revealed that she likes to destroy men, and attempts to make Matsumaru think he slept with her, and tell Aka. Her plan fails when Aka keeps her faith in him.

Matsumaru's colleague, who is a fan of Aka.

An eccentric movie director who recruits Aka for his newest movie, takes her to Hokkaido, which prompts Matsumaru to pursue her. It's revealed that he had no intentions aside from writing a new script, and helps to strengthen Aka's and Matsumaru's relationship.

Nicknamed "Kushi", he is a popular actor who is obsessed with Aka, and becomes friends with Matsumaru to get to her. He moves in next door to them, and confesses to Matsumaru that he loves Aka, and she overhears. He proceeds to come around their house, and Matsumaru has to hide Aka. Kushi actually used to be a fat kid named Yamada that attended the same middle school as Aka. When Aka rejects him he thinks it's because she wants a shōjo manga "hero", so he loses weight and becomes an actor. Despite his initial reasons, Kushi actually becomes good friends with Matsumaru and figures out on his own that Matsumaru and Aka are lovers living together.  When Kushi receives injuries to his face after protecting Aka from being injured during a car accident, he apparently convinces Aka into having sex with him.  After Kushi realizes that Aka does not want to and that she has already found her "hero" he becomes disgusted with himself and apologizes, but says if Matsumaru ever turns into a bad guy he is always there.

Aka's previous manager who tried to control her personal life to maximize her popularity.

Aka's younger sister. She is first introduced in chapter thirty-one in the fourth manga volume. She is a very talented animator and is the chief animator on Aka's new movie Jupiter the Great. She despises her sister and also falls in love with Matsumaru. She makes several attempts to flirt with Matsumaru and tries to break him up with Aka. Ao comes down with a cold and while Matsumaru is caring for her they are seen by Aka in a naked embrace. This misunderstanding results in Aka beginning to doubt how faithful Matsumaru is. Ao delights in the idea that she tore Matsumaru away from Aka in the same manner that Aka "stole" their father away from her. In chapter thirty-seven Ao falls into depression and comes out of it when Aka and the animation team for Aka's animated film Jupiter the Great make a dvd for her. She then admits she was bitter because she felt that Aka "stole" their father, but she still loves her "onee-chan" (sister). Ao seems to have a weird preference for men wearing neckties which initially attracts her to Matsumaru. Ao also admits that while she was not really in love with Matsumaru but she did like him a little bit and starts to refer to him as "onii-chan" (brother).

A voice actor who is a friend of Aka's. She is a huge fan of Kushi.

Aka's other voice actor friend, she is best friends with Maki, and they are often seen together. She has to pretend to be Matsumaru's girlfriend when Kushi comes to their house.

Media

Manga
Shogakukan collected its chapters in sixteen tankōbon volumes, released from September 19, 2003, to June 19, 2013.

Anime
An anime adaptation containing nine twelve-minute episodes was animated by Shaft and aired in Japan between February 3 and March 31, 2006; a single original video animation episode was also produced. The anime's opening theme is  performed by Kanako Sakai, written by Hiiro Misaki, and composed and arranged by Kōhei Koyama. The anime's ending theme is "Devotion" performed by BRACE;d, and written, composed, and arranged by a.k.a.dRESS (ave;new).

The series was directed by Ryūtarō Nakamura and written by Reiko Yoshida and features music by Kei Haneoka. Hideyuki Morioka designed the characters and served as chief animation director. Four of the episodes were outsourced outside of Shaft: episode 2 to Daume; and episodes 3, 5, and 7 to Studio Pastoral.

Episode list
All episodes were written by Reiko Yoshida and storyboarded by Ryūtarō Nakamura.

Visual novel
Idea Factory released a visual novel adaptation, titled Rec: Doki Doki Seiyū Paradise, on November 30, 2006 in limited and regular editions; the limited edition included a bonus CD, a small art book, and different cover artwork. The player assumes the role of Fumihiko Matsumaru who is the director for a new television project. The goal is to choose who will be the main voice actress for the project, create new relationships, complete advertising campaigns among other things. In addition to the standard romance element where the player can choose between dating Momiji Endō and Aka Onda, there is also a "multi-seiyū system" where the player chooses between the potential voice actresses to play the voice in an anime. There are also web radio, photo shoots, and Akihabara events in which the voice actresses participate. Rec: Doki Doki Seiyū Paradise received a combined score of 24/40—from a score of 6/10 from each of the four reviewers—from the Japanese video game magazine Famitsu''.

Notes

References

External links
Anime official website 
Rec: Doki Doki Seiyū Paradise official website 

2002 manga
2006 anime OVAs
2006 anime television series debuts
2006 Japanese television series endings
2006 video games
Anime series based on manga
Bishōjo games
Japan-exclusive video games
PlayStation 2 games
PlayStation 2-only games
Romantic comedy anime and manga
Seinen manga
Shaft (company)
Shogakukan manga
TBS Television (Japan) original programming
Video games based on anime and manga
Video games developed in Japan
Visual novels